You Still Here, Ho? is the debut studio album by American rapper Flo Milli. It was released on July 20, 2022, by '94 Sounds and RCA Records. It is the follow-up to her major-label debut mixtape, Ho, Why Is You Here?.

Background and release 
On June 17, Flo Milli released the single "Conceited" and announced the title of the album. The album's release date of July 22 was revealed alongside a new track, "No Face", which was produced by Tasha Catour.

On July 19, Flo Milli released the 15 song track list for You Still Here, Ho?, revealing features from Tiffany Pollard, Babyface Ray and Rico Nasty.

Originally planned for release on July 22, 2022, Flo Milli took to twitter to announce the album would release early on July 20, 2022 instead.

Music and lyrics 
Flo Milli uses the image of Tiffany Pollard in her raps, making listeners feel that "the main character of a reality show made a hip hop album." "Conceited" is a "thudding Southern revamp of Remy Ma’s 2006 classic" with Milli rapping, “Please don't bark cause Milli bite back.”

Critical reception 

Clarissa Brooks of Pitchfork wrote that You Still Here, Ho? is "her most adventurous form yet." Hwang Duha of Rhythmer commented that "the music itself is not special", but Flo Milli "balances this out with completeness and unique concept." Writing for The Line of Best Fit, John Amen gave the album 7/10 and commented, "You Still Here, Ho? runs the fundamentals of hip-hop – aggression, wit, violent diarism, and primitivistic sounds – through a contemporary filter largely defined by social media and selfie culture."

Track listing

Sample credits
 "Pretty Girls" interpolates "Girls Just Want to Have Fun" written by Robert Hazard and performed by Cyndi Lauper.
 "F.N.G.M." samples "Get Money" by Junior M.A.F.I.A., written by Christopher Wallace, Kimberly Jones, and Lamont Juarez Porter, which samples "You Can't Turn Me Away" written by Roy Ayers, Sylvia Striplin, and James Bedford, Jr., and performed by Striplin.
 "Roaring 20s" contains a sample of "If I Were a Rich Man" from the 1971 musical, Fiddler on the Roof, written by Sheldon Harnick and Jerry Bock, and performed by Chaim Topol.

References 

2022 debut albums
Flo Milli albums
Hip hop albums by American artists
RCA Records albums
Albums produced by Kenny Beats
Albums produced by Dr. Luke
Sequel albums